Gail A. Shea  (born April 6, 1959) is a Canadian politician who served as the Member of Parliament for Egmont from 2008 to 2015. She was previously a member of the Legislative Assembly of Prince Edward Island from 2000 to 2007, representing the electoral district of Tignish-DeBlois as a member of the Progressive Conservative Party.

Shea served as the Minister of Fisheries and Oceans in the federal cabinet.

Provincial politics

Minister of Community and Cultural Affairs

Shea served as Minister of Community and Cultural Affairs from 2000 to 2003, under the second administration of Premier Pat Binns. During this period Shea's responsibilities included the Status of Women in the province, as well as providing oversight on the Workers Compensation Board and the Island Waste Management Corporation.

Minister of Transportation and Public Works
From 2003 to 2007 Shea served as Minister of Transportation and Public Works. In this position, Shea oversaw the implementation of a graduated licensing system in her home province.

Federal politics
Shea stood as the Conservative Party of Canada candidate in the riding of Egmont for the 2008 federal election. On October 14, 2008, she became the first non-Liberal MP from Prince Edward Island in 24 years. On October 30, 2008, Shea was appointed the federal Minister of Fisheries and Oceans. She is only the third female MP from Prince Edward Island, following Margaret Mary Macdonald and Catherine Callbeck.

In the 2011 federal election, Shea was re-elected by a margin of 4500 votes. On May 18, 2011, she was appointed Minister of National Revenue. In July 2013, Shea was moved back into the fisheries position. In the 2015 election, Shea was defeated by Liberal Bobby Morrissey.

Pie incident

On January 25, 2010, Shea was pied while giving a speech at the Canada Centre for Inland Waters. An American PETA activist, Emily McCoy, was arrested in Burlington in connection with the incident, and charged with assault.  PETA has taken public responsibility for the incident, saying that it was part of a broader campaign against the Canadian Government's support of the seal hunt.

In response to the pieing of the Fisheries Minister, a long time Liberal MP Gerry Byrne denounced the attack on the minister as an act of terrorism. He commented on the 26th, "When someone actually coaches or conducts criminal behaviour to impose a political agenda on each and every other citizen of Canada, that does seem to me to meet the test of a terrorist organization." Byrne continued to say, "I am calling on the Government of Canada to actually investigate whether or not this organization, PETA, is acting as a terrorist organization under the test that exists under Canadian law." In response to his interpretation of Canadian law, PETA president Ingrid Newkirk said Byrne's reaction was "a silly, chest-beating exercise."

When commenting on the event later, Shea remarked, "I can tell you that this incident actually strengthens my resolve to support the seal hunt. If this is what it takes to stand up for Canadian sealing families and this industry I'm certainly very proud to do it."

Electoral record

Federal

Provincial

References

External links
Gail Shea official site

1959 births
Women members of the House of Commons of Canada
Conservative Party of Canada MPs
Critics of animal rights
Living people
Members of the Executive Council of Prince Edward Island
Members of the House of Commons of Canada from Prince Edward Island
Members of the King's Privy Council for Canada
People from Tignish, Prince Edward Island
Progressive Conservative Party of Prince Edward Island MLAs
Women MLAs in Prince Edward Island
Members of the 28th Canadian Ministry
Women government ministers of Canada
21st-century Canadian women politicians